The United States Air Force's 236th Combat Communications Squadron (236 CBCS) is an Air National Guard combat communications unit located at Hammond, Louisiana. It is part of the Louisiana Air National Guard. In late 2011, approximately 30 members of the squadron deployed to Afghanistan.

Assignments

Major Command/Gaining Command
14th Air Force (1953–1979)
Air Force Communications Command (1979–1993?)
Air National Guard/Air Force Communications Service/254th Combat Communications Group (1978–present)
Air Force Space Command (?–present)

Previous designations
236th Airways Air Communication Service Flight (1953–1976)
236th Combat Communications Flight (1976–1982)
236th Combat Communications Squadron (1982–1985)
236th Combat Information Systems Squadron (1985–1986)
236th Combat Communications Squadron (1986–present)

Bases stationed
New Orleans Airport (1953–1954)
Hammond Airport (1954–present)

Equipment Operated
 MPN-14 Mobile Air Traffic Control Radar System throughout the 1980s.
Mobile Air Traffic Control Tower (1980s).
Mobile Crypto Communications System (1980s).
Satellite Communications Arrays (1980s).

Awards/Decorations
Air Force Outstanding Unit Award: 1 May 1976 – 30 April 1978; 1 January 1989 – 31 December 1990; 1 May 1992 – 30 April 1993; 1 May 1993 – 30 April 1994; 1 May 1995 – 30 April 1996; 1 July 1998 – 30 June 2000; 1 October 2006 – 30 September 2008.

Emblem
Blue and yellow are the Air Force colors. Blue alludes to the sky, the primary theater of Air Force operations. Yellow refers to the sun and the excellence required of Air Force personnel. The fleur-de-lis represents the Squadron and alludes to the French heritage of the unit's home location. The three stars on the fleur-de-lis stand for the professionalism, dedication, and military preparedness exhibited by the personnel of the unit. The globe suggests the unit's worldwide deployment capability. The polestar symbolizes the North Star and represents the unit's wartime air traffic control and navigational aids mission.

See also
 List of United States Air Force communications squadrons

References

External links
 236th Combat Communications Squadron (official website)

Combat Communications 0236
Squadrons of the United States Air National Guard
Military units and formations in Louisiana